Elgg railway station is a railway station in the Swiss canton of Zurich and municipality of Elgg. The station is located on the St. Gallen–Winterthur line and is served by trains on the Zurich S-Bahn lines S12 and S35.

Services 
The following services stop at Elgg:

References

External links 
 
 

Elgg
Elgg